

A
Ayouma (1978)

B
Boxing Libreville (2018)

C 
 Cage, La (1963)
 Carte postale sur Port-Gentil (1979) 
 Cours toujours, tu m'intéresse (2003)

D
Damier, Le (1996)
Demain un jour nouveau (1979)
Divorce, Le (2008)
Djogo (2002) 
Dupa-amiaza unui tortionar (2001) 
Dôlé (2000)

E
Équateur (1983)
Erable et l'okoumé, L (1983)

G
Grand blanc de Lambaréné, Le (1995)

I
Identité (1972)
Il était une fois Libreville (1972) 
Ilombe (1979)

L
Le silence de la forêt (2003)

O
O'Bali (1977) 
Okoumé bois national'''' (1980) Où vas-tu, Koumba? (1971)

PProfile de l'Ogooue maritime (1982)

RThe Rhythm Of My Life: Ismael Sankara (2011)

T Tam tams se sont tus, Les (1972)Terres d'or, Les'' (1925)

External links
 Gabonese film at the Internet Movie Database

Gabon